Ustye may refer to several places in Russia:

Arkhangelsk Oblast
Ustye, Arkhangelsk Oblast, a village in Ryabovsky Selsoviet of Lensky District

Chuvash Republic
Ustye, Chuvash Republic, a selo in Pitishevskoye Rural Settlement of Alikovsky District

Ivanovo Oblast
Ustye, Ivanovo Oblast, a village in Komsomolsky District

Kaluga Oblast
Ustye, Dzerzhinsky District, Kaluga Oblast, a village in Dzerzhinsky District
Ustye, Zhizdrinsky District, Kaluga Oblast, a village in Zhizdrinsky District

Republic of Karelia
Ustye, Republic of Karelia, a settlement in Prionezhsky District

Kirov Oblast
Ustye, Podosinovsky District, Kirov Oblast, a village under the administrative jurisdiction of the urban-type settlement of Podosinovets, Podosinovsky District
Ustye, Tuzhinsky District, Kirov Oblast, a village in Pachinsky Rural Okrug of Tuzhinsky District
Ustye, Yuryansky District, Kirov Oblast, a village in Medyansky Rural Okrug of Yuryansky District

Krasnoyarsk Krai
Ustye, Krasnoyarsk Krai, a settlement in Mashukovsky Selsoviet of Motyginsky District

Leningrad Oblast
Ustye, Tikhvinsky District, Leningrad Oblast, a village in Tsvylevskoye Settlement Municipal Formation of Tikhvinsky District
Ustye, Volosovsky District, Leningrad Oblast, a village in Sabskoye Settlement Municipal Formation of Volosovsky District

Moscow Oblast
Ustye, Naro-Fominsky District, Moscow Oblast, a village in Volchenkovskoye Rural Settlement of Naro-Fominsky District
Ustye, Odintsovsky District, Moscow Oblast, a village in Yershovskoye Rural Settlement of Odintsovsky District
Ustye, Ruzsky District, Moscow Oblast, a village in Staroruzskoye Rural Settlement of Ruzsky District

Nenets Autonomous Okrug
Ustye, Nenets Autonomous Okrug, a village in Telvisochny Selsoviet of Zapolyarny District

Novgorod Oblast
Ustye, Kholmsky District, Novgorod Oblast, a village in Togodskoye Settlement of Kholmsky District
Ustye, Lyubytinsky District, Novgorod Oblast, a village under the administrative jurisdiction of the urban-type settlement of Nebolchi, Lyubytinsky District
Ustye, Malovishersky District, Novgorod Oblast, a village in Verebyinskoye Settlement of Malovishersky District
Ustye, Pestovsky District, Novgorod Oblast, a village in Ustyutskoye Settlement of Pestovsky District
Ustye, Poddorsky District, Novgorod Oblast, a village in Poddorskoye Settlement of Poddorsky District
Ustye, Starorussky District, Novgorod Oblast, a village in Ivanovskoye Settlement of Starorussky District

Penza Oblast
Ustye, Penza Oblast, a selo in Ustyinsky Selsoviet of Spassky District

Pskov Oblast
Ustye, Dedovichsky District, Pskov Oblast, a village in Dedovichsky District
Ustye, Gdovsky District, Pskov Oblast, a village in Gdovsky District
Ustye, Kunyinsky District, Pskov Oblast, a village in Kunyinsky District
Ustye (Berezhanskaya Rural Settlement), Ostrovsky District, Pskov Oblast, a village in Ostrovsky District; municipally, a part of Berezhanskaya Rural Settlement of that district
Ustye (Shikovskaya Rural Settlement), Ostrovsky District, Pskov Oblast, a village in Ostrovsky District; municipally, a part of Shikovskaya Rural Settlement of that district
Ustye (Yadrovskaya Rural Settlement), Pskovsky District, Pskov Oblast, a village in Pskovsky District; municipally, a part of Yadrovskaya Rural Settlement of that district
Ustye (Logozovskaya Rural Settlement), Pskovsky District, Pskov Oblast, a village in Pskovsky District; municipally, a part of Logozovskaya Rural Settlement of that district
Ustye, Pushkinogorsky District, Pskov Oblast, a village in Pushkinogorsky District
Ustye, Pustoshkinsky District, Pskov Oblast, a village in Pustoshkinsky District

Ryazan Oblast
Ustye, Ryazan Oblast, a selo in Ustyevsky Rural Okrug of Sasovsky District

Sakha Republic
Ustye, Sakha Republic, a selo in Ustyinsky Rural Okrug of Suntarsky District

Smolensk Oblast
Ustye, Dukhovshchinsky District, Smolensk Oblast, a village in Dobrinskoye Rural Settlement of Dukhovshchinsky District
Ustye, Kholm-Zhirkovsky District, Smolensk Oblast, a village under the administrative jurisdiction of Kholm-Zhirkovskoye Urban Settlement of Kholm-Zhirkovsky District
Ustye, Sychyovsky District, Smolensk Oblast, a village in Maltsevskoye Rural Settlement of Sychyovsky District
Ustye, Vyazemsky District, Smolensk Oblast, a village in Yefremovskoye Rural Settlement of Vyazemsky District
Ustye, Yartsevsky District, Smolensk Oblast, a village in Kapyrevshchinskoye Rural Settlement of Yartsevsky District

Tambov Oblast
Ustye, Michurinsky District, Tambov Oblast, a selo in Ustyinsky Selsoviet of Michurinsky District
Ustye, Morshansky District, Tambov Oblast, a selo in Ustyinsky Selsoviet of Morshansky District

Tula Oblast
Ustye, Tula Oblast, a village in Ustyinsky Rural Okrug of Kimovsky District

Tver Oblast
Ustye, Bologovsky District, Tver Oblast, a village in Bologovsky District
Ustye, Kalininsky District, Tver Oblast, a village in Kalininsky District
Ustye, Kalyazinsky District, Tver Oblast, a village in Kalyazinsky District
Ustye, Konakovsky District, Tver Oblast, a village in Konakovsky District
Ustye (settlement), Selizharovsky District, Tver Oblast, a settlement in Selizharovsky District
Ustye (village), Selizharovsky District, Tver Oblast, a village in Selizharovsky District
Ustye, Udomelsky District, Tver Oblast, a village in Udomelsky District
Ustye, Zapadnodvinsky District, Tver Oblast, a village in Zapadnodvinsky District
Ustye, Zharkovsky District, Tver Oblast, a village in Zharkovsky District
Ustye, Zubtsovsky District, Tver Oblast, a village in Zubtsovsky District

Vladimir Oblast
Ustye, Vladimir Oblast, a selo in Sobinsky District

Vologda Oblast
Ustye, Artyushinsky Selsoviet, Belozersky District, Vologda Oblast, a village in Artyushinsky Selsoviet of Belozersky District
Ustye, Gorodishchensky Selsoviet, Belozersky District, Vologda Oblast, a village in Gorodishchensky Selsoviet of Belozersky District
Ustye, Kirillovsky District, Vologda Oblast, a village in Ferapontovsky Selsoviet of Kirillovsky District
Ustye, Totemsky District, Vologda Oblast, a village in Ust-Pechengsky Selsoviet of Totemsky District
Ustye, Ust-Kubinsky District, Vologda Oblast, a selo in Ustyansky Selsoviet of Ust-Kubinsky District
Ustye, Vashkinsky District, Vologda Oblast, a village in Vasilyevsky Selsoviet of Vashkinsky District
Ustye, Vytegorsky District, Vologda Oblast, a village in Tudozersky Selsoviet of Vytegorsky District

Voronezh Oblast
Ustye, Khokholsky District, Voronezh Oblast, a selo in Petinskoye Rural Settlement of Khokholsky District
Ustye, Semiluksky District, Voronezh Oblast, a khutor in Starovedugskoye Rural Settlement of Semiluksky District

Yaroslavl Oblast
Ustye, Bolsheselsky District, Yaroslavl Oblast, a village in Novoselsky Rural Okrug of Bolsheselsky District
Ustye, Yaroslavsky District, Yaroslavl Oblast, a selo in Ryutnevsky Rural Okrug of Yaroslavsky District
Ustye (river), a tributary of the Kotorosl

Zabaykalsky Krai
Ustye, Zabaykalsky Krai, a selo in Kyrinsky District

See also
Ustya (disambiguation)